Pribrezhny is the name of several rural localities in Russia:
Pribrezhny, Amur Oblast, a settlement  in Vostochny Selsoviet of Oktyabrsky District, Amur Oblast
Pribrezhny, Astrakhan Oblast, a settlement in Zamyansky Selsoviet of Yenotayevsky District, Astrakhan Oblast